Etodesnitazene (Desnitroetonitazene, Etazen, Etazene, Etazone) is a benzimidazole derived opioid analgesic drug, which was originally developed in the late 1950s alongside etonitazene and a range of related derivatives. It is many times less potent than etonitazene itself, but still 70x more potent than morphine in animal studies. Corresponding analogues where the N,N-diethyl group is replaced by piperidine or pyrrolidine rings also retain significant activity (10x and 20x morphine respectively). Etodesnitazene has been sold as a designer drug, first being identified in both Poland and Finland in March 2020.

See also 
 Brorphine
 Etonitazepyne
 Isotonitazene
 Metonitazene
 Metodesnitazene
 MCHB-1
 List of benzimidazole opioids

References 

Analgesics
Designer drugs
Benzimidazole opioids